Antonia Liskova (born 25 March 1977) is a Slovak-Italian actress.

Career
Liskova lived in Slovakia until her 17th birthday. After graduating in pharmacology and medicinal chemistry, her father offered her a trip to Italy where she worked as waitress in a small bar in Rome after starting a modeling career in Milan.

Later she returned to Rome and started to work as actress.

Personal life 
In 2010 Antonia married the plastic surgeon Luca Ferrarese. The couple has a daughter.

Filmography
Her roles include:
Gnjurac (1993)
C'era un cinese in coma (2000)
Gioco con la morte (2001)
Il Piacere di piacere (2002)
La notte di Pasquino (2003)
Il Tunnel della libertà (2004, TV)
Riparo – Anis tra di noi (2007)
Inspector Montalbano - La luna di carta (2008, TV)
Giulia non esce la sera (2009)
La banda dei Babbi Natale (2010)
Le cose che restano (2010)
Tutti pazzi per amore (2010)
Mary of Nazareth (2012)

References

External links
Official website
 

1977 births
Living people
Italian film actresses
Italian television actresses
Slovak film actresses
Slovak television actresses
20th-century Italian actresses
21st-century Italian actresses
20th-century Slovak actresses
21st-century Slovak actresses
Italian people of Slovak descent